Fowlerton can refer to a place in the United States:

 Fowlerton, Indiana
 Fowlerton, Texas